Mexico Beach is a city in Bay County, Florida, United States. The population was 1,060 at the 2020 census. The community was extensively damaged by Hurricane Michael on October 10, 2018. The Federal Emergency Management Agency (FEMA) declared the community "wiped out" in the aftermath of the hurricane's devastating impact.

History

Mexico Beach was incorporated in 1966. Before Hurricane Michael, "the town was "old Florida," ... a collection of 50-year-old bungalows and newer vacation homes on stilts," where tourists walked on white sand beaches.

On November 22, 1985, Hurricane Kate's eye passed over Mexico Beach. Category 2 winds and tides destroyed beachfront homes and businesses.

Hurricane Michael

Michael made history as the third strongest (by pressure) and fourth strongest (by wind speed) landfalling storm in the continental United States. The storm caused extensive damage to the community, and to the nearby Tyndall Air Force Base. Nearly all homes were totally destroyed. Brock Long, the FEMA administrator, told CNN that Mexico Beach was "wiped out" and referred to the community as "ground zero". The elementary school and city hall were among the buildings devastated; the pier washed away, and the water tower was knocked down.

A report by the State indicated that roughly 285 people in Mexico Beach had declined to evacuate the area, although some of those may have left before the peak of the storm. Three people from Mexico Beach were listed among the deaths due to the hurricane. At that time, Mayor Al Cathey told residents it might be months before electricity, water, and plumbing were restored.

Geography

Mexico Beach is located in the Florida Panhandle.

Demographics

As of the census of 2010, there were 1,072 people, 563 households, and 320 families residing in the city. The racial makeup of the city was 93.1% White, 1.9% African American, 0.4% Native American, 0.7% Asian, 0.0% Native Hawaiian or other Pacific Islander, 0.8% some other race, and 3.1% from two or more races. Hispanic or Latino of any race were 2.6% of the population.

There were 563 households, out of which 11.4% had children under the age of 18 living with them, 47.8% were headed by married couples living together, 6.7% had a female householder with no husband present, and 43.2% were non-families. 38.4% of all households were made up of individuals, and 15.6% were someone living alone who was 65 years of age or older. The average household size was 1.90, and the average family size was 2.43.

In the city, the population was spread out, with 11.3% under the age of 18, 5.4% from 18 to 24, 16.7% from 25 to 44, 35.5% from 45 to 64, and 31.2% who were 65 years of age or older. The median age was 55.1 years. For every 100 females, there were 94.2 males. For every 100 females age 18 and over, there were 95.3 males.

At the 2000 census, the median income for a household in the city was $31,950, and the median income for a family was $40,163. Males had a median income of $30,278 versus $23,125 for females. The per capita income for the city was $22,871. About 8.1% of families and 11.5% of the population were below the poverty line, including 18.8% of those under age 18 and 10.7% of those age 65 or over.

Education

Although physically located in Bay County, Mexico Beach is served by Gulf County Schools rather than the Bay District Schools. Mexico Beach is located within the school district boundary of Bay District schools, which then pays the Gulf County district the tuition money for Mexico Beach residents.

References

External links

 
 

Cities in Bay County, Florida
Populated coastal places in Florida on the Gulf of Mexico
Populated places established in 1966
Cities in Florida
1966 establishments in Florida